In electrical engineering, the maximum power transfer theorem states that, to obtain maximum external power from a power source with internal resistance, the resistance of the load must equal the resistance of the source as viewed from its output terminals. Moritz von Jacobi published the maximum power (transfer) theorem around 1840; it is also referred to as "Jacobi's law".

The theorem results in maximum power transfer from the power source to the load, and not maximum efficiency of useful power out of total power consumed. If the load resistance is made larger than the source resistance, then efficiency increases (since a higher percentage of the source power is transferred to the load), but the magnitude of the load power decreases (since the total circuit resistance increases). If the load resistance is made smaller than the source resistance, then efficiency decreases (since most of the power ends up being dissipated in the source). Although the total power dissipated increases (due to a lower total resistance), the amount dissipated in the load decreases.

The theorem states how to choose (so as to maximize power transfer) the load resistance, once the source resistance is given. It is a common misconception to apply the theorem in the opposite scenario.  It does not say how to choose the source resistance for a given load resistance. In fact, the source resistance that maximizes power transfer from a voltage source is always zero (the hypothetical ideal voltage source), regardless of the value of the load resistance.

The theorem can be extended to alternating current circuits that include reactance, and states that maximum power transfer occurs when the load impedance is equal to the complex conjugate of the source impedance.

The mathematics of the theorem also applies to other physical interactions, such as:

 mechanical collisions between two objects, 
 the sharing of charge between two capacitors, 
 liquid flow between two cylinders,
 the transmission and reflection of light at the boundary between two media.

Maximizing power transfer versus power efficiency 

The theorem was originally misunderstood (notably by Joule) to imply that a system consisting of an electric motor driven by a battery could not be more than 50% efficient, since the power dissipated as heat in the battery would always be equal to the power delivered to the motor when the impedances were matched. 

In 1880 this assumption was shown to be false by either Edison or his colleague Francis Robbins Upton, who realized that maximum efficiency was not the same as maximum power transfer.  

To achieve maximum efficiency, the resistance of the source (whether a battery or a dynamo) could be (or should be) made as close to zero as possible. Using this new understanding, they obtained an efficiency of about 90%, and proved that the electric motor was a practical alternative to the heat engine.

Consider three particular cases:
 If , then  Efficiency approaches 0% if the load resistance approaches zero (a short circuit), since all power is consumed in the source and no power is consumed in the short. Note, voltage sources must have some resistance.
 If , then  Efficiency is only 50% if the load resistance equals the source resistance (which is the condition of maximum power transfer).
 If , then  Efficiency approaches 100% if the load resistance approaches infinity (though the total power level tends towards zero) or if the source resistance approaches zero. Using a large ratio is called impedance bridging.

Impedance matching

A related concept is reflectionless impedance matching.  

In radio frequency transmission lines, and other electronics, there is often a requirement to match the source impedance (at the transmitter) to the load impedance (such as an antenna) to avoid reflections in the transmission line that could overload or damage the transmitter.

Calculus-based proof for purely resistive circuits 
In the simplified model of powering a load with resistance  by a source with voltage  and source resistance , then by Ohm's law the resulting current  is simply the source voltage divided by the total circuit resistance:

The power  dissipated in the load is the square of the current multiplied by the resistance:

is a minimum.  The result will be the same in either case.  Differentiating the denominator with respect to :

For a maximum or minimum, the first derivative is zero, so

or

To find out whether this solution is a minimum or a maximum, the denominator expression is differentiated again:

The above proof assumes fixed source resistance . When the source resistance can be varied, power transferred to the load can be increased by reducing .

Note that this shows that maximum power transfer can also be interpreted as the load voltage being equal to one-half of the Thevenin voltage equivalent of the source.

In reactive circuits
The power transfer theorem also applies when the source and/or load are not purely resistive. 

A refinement of the maximum power theorem says that any reactive components of source and load should be of equal magnitude but opposite sign.  (See below for a derivation.)  
 This means that the source and load impedances should be complex conjugates of each other.  
 In the case of purely resistive circuits, the two concepts are identical.  

Physically realizable sources and loads are not usually purely resistive, having some inductive or capacitive components, and so practical applications of this theorem, under the name of complex conjugate impedance matching, do, in fact, exist.

If the source is totally inductive (capacitive), then a totally capacitive (inductive) load, in the absence of resistive losses, would receive 100% of the energy from the source but send it back after a quarter cycle.

The resultant circuit is nothing other than a resonant LC circuit in which the energy continues to oscillate to and fro.  This oscillation is called reactive power. 

Power factor correction (where an inductive reactance is used to "balance out" a capacitive one), is essentially the same  idea as complex conjugate impedance matching although it is done for entirely different reasons.

For a fixed reactive source, the maximum power theorem maximizes the real power (P) delivered to the load by complex conjugate matching the load to the source.

For a fixed reactive load, power factor correction minimizes the apparent power (S) (and unnecessary current) conducted by the transmission lines, while maintaining the same amount of real power transfer. 

This is done by adding a reactance to the load to balance out the load's own reactance, changing the reactive load impedance into a resistive load impedance.

Proof 

In this diagram, AC power is being transferred from the source, with phasor magnitude of voltage  (positive peak voltage) and fixed source impedance  (S for source), to a load with impedance  (L for load), resulting in a (positive) magnitude  of the  current phasor .  This magnitude  results from dividing the magnitude of the source voltage by the magnitude of the total circuit impedance:

The average power  dissipated in the load is the square of the current multiplied by the resistive portion (the real part)  of the load impedance :

is a minimum. Since reactances can be negative, this is achieved by adapting the load reactance to

This reduces the above equation to:

This problem has the same form as in the purely resistive case, and the maximizing condition therefore is 

The two maximizing conditions

Notes

References
H.W. Jackson (1959) Introduction to Electronic Circuits, Prentice-Hall.

External links 
 Conjugate matching versus reflectionless matching (PDF) taken from  Electromagnetic Waves and Antennas
 The Spark Transmitter. 2. Maximising Power, part 1.

Circuit theorems
Electrical engineering